The 54th Security Force Assistance Brigade (54th SFAB) is a Security Force Assistance Brigade of the United States Army. It is an Army National Guard formation headquartered out of Indiana and falls under the Regular Army's Security Force Assistance Command.

Formation 
The 54th Brigade was established in March 2020.  Power, mission command and tactical radio equipment for the 1st, 2nd and 54th SFABs’ M1151 High Mobility Multi-purposed Wheeled Vehicles (HMMWVs) were upgraded to SFAB priorities.

According to the United States Army, Security Force Assistance Brigades are the dedicated conventional organisations for conducting security force assistance around the world. Each SFAB would have a regional focus and its capabilities would enable it to perform with minimal cultural and regional orientation.

Composition 
Each Security Force Assistance Brigade consists of about 800 senior and noncommissioned officers.  The 54th SFAB consists of six battalions and a headquarters company spread throughout six states.
 Headquarters and Headquarters Company, Indiana
 1st Battalion, Georgia
 2nd Battalion, Florida
 3rd Battalion, Florida
 4th Battalion, Texas
 5th Battalion, Ohio
 6th Battalion, Illinois

See also 
 Security Force Assistance Brigade

References

Brigades of the United States Army
Military units and formations established in 2020
Military advisory groups